Lebu Group is stratigraphic unit of Arauco Basin in south-central Chile. The group consists of a sequence of four formations, of both marine and nonmarine origin, deposited between the Early Paleocene and Middle Eocene.

Description 
The group is made up of four formations, from youngest to oldest these are: Millongue Formation, Trihueco Formation, Boca Lebu Formation and Curanilahue Formation.

The Eocene Millongue Formation is composed of shale and siltstone of both marine and continental origin. Its top is marked by an unconformity, the so-called “main unconformity” of Arauco Basin, which is thought to have formed by erosion during a period of tectonic inversion.

Notes

References 

Geologic groups of South America
Geologic formations of Chile
Paleocene Series of South America
Eocene Series of South America
Paleogene Chile
Danian Stage
Selandian Stage
Thanetian Stage
Ypresian Stage
Lutetian Stage
Bartonian Stage
Shale formations
Sandstone formations
Siltstone formations
Mudstone formations
Coal formations
Geology of Biobío Region